Selma M'Nasria (born October 11, 1986) is a Tunisian female professional basketball player.

External links
Profile at fiba.com

1986 births
Living people
People from Sfax
Tunisian women's basketball players
Centers (basketball)